William Ambrose may refer to:
William Ambrose (politician) (1832–1908), English judge and politician
William Ambrose (Emrys) (1813–1873), Welsh language poet and minister of religion
William Ambrose (Baptist minister) (1832–1878), Welsh Baptist minister and antiquary

See also